George Reed may refer to:

George Reed (Canadian football) (born 1939), Canadian running back
George Reed (cricketer) (1906–1988), Welsh cricketer
George B. Reed (1807–1883), American politician and lawyer
George H. Reed (1866–1952), African American actor
George McCullagh Reed (1831–1898), minister, journalist and newspaper owner
George W. Reed (1831–1906), Union Army soldier
George Reed (musician) (1922–2011), American jazz percussionist and singer

See also
George Read (disambiguation)
George Reid (disambiguation)
George Reade (1687–1756), soldier